The ChangKong-2 is a supersonic target drone developed by the People's Republic of China in the late 1990s.

Specifications

Operators

People's Liberation Army Air Force

Specifications

See also

References

1990s Chinese military aircraft
Target drones of China
1990s Chinese aircraft